Bulum is a rural locality (an ulus) in Khorinsky District, Republic of Buryatia, Russia. The population was 352 as of 2010. There are 7 streets.

Geography 
Bulum is located 28 km northeast of Khorinsk (the district's administrative centre) by road. Oninoborsk is the nearest rural locality.

References 

Rural localities in Khorinsky District